The Stockgrowers State Bank, located at 8th and Main Sts. in Ashland, Kansas, was built in 1887.  It has also been known as First National Bank, for whom the building was first built, and which operated for about a year.   It was listed on the National Register of Historic Places in 1972.

References

External links

Bank buildings on the National Register of Historic Places in Kansas
Romanesque Revival architecture in Kansas
Commercial buildings completed in 1887
Clark County, Kansas